{{Infobox person
| name = Tomoyuki Itamura板村 智幸
| image = 
| alt =
| caption =
| birth_date = 
| birth_place = Japan
| death_date =
| death_place =
| death_cause =
| known_for = Monogatari series (2011–2017){{efn|Seasons Nisemonogatari, Nekomonogatari (Black), Monogatari Series Second Season, Hanamonogatari, Tsukimonogatari, Owarimonogatari, Koyomimonogatari, and Owarimonogatari II.}}
| employer = OLM (2002–2006) Shaft (2007–2017)
| occupation = Animator, director, storyboard artist
| awards = 
| years_active = 2002–present
| spouse =
| website =
}}

 is a Japanese director, animator, and storyboard artist. He joined OLM in 2002 as an in-between animator and left in 2007 to join Shaft. Itamura took over the Monogatari series from Tatsuya Oishi as his television directorial debut with Nisemonogatari. With Akiyuki Shinbo, Itamura directed all subsequent televised installments until he left the studio following Owarimonogatari II.

Career
Itamura joined OLM in 2002, and he first served as an in-between animator on the studio's Pokémon Chronicles television series. In 2006, he storyboarded two episodes of Ray the Animation, and the following year left the studio, where he then joined Shaft. That year, he debuted as an episode director with the 3rd episode of Sayonara, Zetsubou-Sensei, and in 2008 debuted as a project director under the chief direction of Akiyuki Shinbo with Mahō Sensei Negima!: Shiroki Tsubasa Ala Alba. In 2012, Itamura succeeded Tatsuya Oishi as the successor to Shaft's adaptation of the Monogatari series following Oishi's decision to animate the Kizumonogatari novels in film format (which was completed in 2017). Beginning with Nisemonogatari, Itamura directed all subsequent televised Monogatari series productions until Owarimonogatari II in 2017, which was the year he left Shaft.

Style
Itamura's style, specifically as the director of the Monogatari series, has been described as being much more minimalistic than his predecessor Tatsuya Oishi, with analysis of his style placing emphasis on sharp color contrasts, shifts in stylistic artistry, changes in overall color schemes, and the implementation of "chapter breaks" that make use of the "adaptive nature" of the series. However, as Itamura was given the opportunity to take over the Monogatari series following Oishi's footsteps, Itamura's identity as a director can be seen as developing throughout the series. Initially, Itamura incorporated (but more sparingly) similar visual language as far as on-screen text usage as his predecessor, such as having Kanji text flash as non-sequiturs, puns, wordplay, and so forth. In Monogatari Series Second Season, Itamura attempts to use more text and flashes than previously, and using them in a wider variety of circumstances and performing a wider variety of jobs. Whereas Oishi may have used paragraphs of text from the novel, or short fragments of sentences or Kanji, Itamura began to employ on-screen text as chapter titles (the aforementioned chapter breaks) or to represent character dialogues and thoughts. however, in Tsukimonogatari, and in the rest of the series, the visual language changes to its final form in Itamura's care. Rather than use Oishi's method of solidly-colored screens with text, Itamura used paper collage-like transitions that emphasized certain parts of the text by highlighting them. Shifting away from using such transitions for tempo and visual emphasis, the final works in Itamura's Monogatari'' tenure instead make use of on-screen text to provide to the narrative itself, often showcasing unreliable narration from the perspective of a character or insight into their experiences.

Works

Television series
 Highlights roles with series directorial duties.

OVAs
 Highlights roles with series directorial duties.

ONAs
 Highlights roles with series directorial duties.

Films

Notes

Works cited

References

External links
 
 

Japanese animators
Japanese storyboard artists
Anime directors
Living people
Year of birth missing (living people)